Stefan Mladenovic (born 3 April 1994) is a Norwegian footballer who plays for Arendal Fotball.

He is an ethnic Croat.

Career

Sandefjord
Mladenovic signed with Sandefjord Fotball on 23 December 2018 for two years.

Career statistics

Club

References

1994 births
Living people
Sportspeople from Vukovar
People from Slavonia
Yugoslav Wars refugees
Croatian emigrants to Norway
Norwegian footballers
Pors Grenland players
Odds BK players
Sandefjord Fotball players
Arendal Fotball players
Eliteserien players
Norwegian First Division players
Norwegian Second Division players
Association football wingers